Aristaenetus (c. AD 365 – after AD 404) was a Roman politician who was appointed consul in AD 404 alongside the western emperor Honorius.

Biography
Aristaenetus was the son of Bassianus (a notarius in the eastern court around the year 371) and Prisca. His grandfather was Thalassius, the praetorian prefect of the East. Possibly a pagan, he was related to the rhetorician Libanius, under whom Aristaenetus was a pupil.

Aristaenetus was a supporter of Flavius Rufinus, and through his influence Aristaenetus was made praefectus urbi of Constantinople in the second half of AD 392. He also visited Antioch for some purpose in AD 393. In AD 404, he was made consul posterior in the East alongside the emperor Honorius, although his position was not recognized in the West by the power behind the western court, the magister utriusque militiae, Stilicho.

References

Sources
 Martindale, J. R.; Jones, A. H. M, The Prosopography of the Later Roman Empire, Vol. I AD 260–395, Cambridge University Press (1971)

360s births
5th-century deaths
Year of birth uncertain
Year of death unknown

4th-century Romans
5th-century Byzantine people
5th-century Roman consuls
Imperial Roman consuls
Late Roman Empire political office-holders
Urban prefects of Constantinople